The Grey Stakes is a Canadian Thoroughbred horse race held annually 
during the first week of October at Woodbine Racetrack in Toronto. A Grade III, it is open to two-year-old horses and is raced on dirt at a distance of  miles. Since 2006, the dirt racing surface at Woodbine Racetrack has been the synthetic Polytrack.

Inaugurated as the Grey Stakes at the Old Woodbine Racetrack in 1906, it was named in honor of the then Governor General of Canada, Earl Grey. Over the years it has been run at various distances:
 1 mile : 1906-1929 (Old Woodbine Racetrack)
 1 mile 70 yards : 1930-1955 (Old Woodbine Racetrack)
  miles : 1956 to present at Woodbine Racetrack

J. K. L. Ross, owner of the first United States Triple Crown Champion, Sir Barton, won this race five years in a row with future U.S. Racing Hall of Fame trainer, Henry McDaniel. In 1926 Henry McDaniel added another win, making him the leader among all winning trainers.

Notable horses who have won the race includes future Canadian Horse Racing Hall of Fame inductees Horometer (1933), Kennedy Road (1970), Sunny's Halo (1982), and Sky Classic (1989). Dancer's Image won the 1967 race and went on to capture the following year's Kentucky Derby, as did Mine That Bird in 2009. Since the creation of the Breeder's Cup races in 1984, Macho Uno is the only horse to have won the Grey Stakes then gone on to win that year's Breeders' Cup Juvenile.

Famous horses who did not win the Grey Stakes include Display who ran second in 1925 but was the ensuing year's Preakness Stakes winner. As well, the 1997 Belmont Stakes winner Touch Gold finished third in the 1996 running of the Grey Stakes.

Records
Time record: (at current  miles distance)
 1:43.20 - Black Cash (1997)

Most wins by an owner:
 5 - J. K. L. Ross (1921, 1922, 1923, 1924, 1925)
 5 - Sam-Son Farm (1984, 1986, 1987, 1989, 2004)

Most wins by a jockey:
 5 - Pat Remillard (1937, 1943, 1947, 1961, 1963)
 5 - Dave Penna (1982, 1986, 1987, 1992, 1995)

Most wins by a trainer:
 6 - Henry McDaniel (1921, 1922, 1923, 1924, 1925, 1926)

Winners of the Grey Stakes since 1956

In 1963 Bimini Bill finished first but was disqualified and set back to second.
In 1999 Exciting Story won but was disqualified and placed fifth.

Earlier winners 

1955 - Compactor
1954 - Senator Jim
1953 - King Maple
1952 - Avella
1951 - I'm Sandy
1950 - Argyle
1949 - Mighty Nice
1948 - Avona
1947 - Dymoke
1946 - Watch Wrack  
1945 - Hyperhelio  
1944 - Dune 
1943 - Green Bush
1942 - Gallant Foe
1941 - Air Sure
1940 - Jascarf
1939 - Second Helping
1938 - Peterhof
1937 - Poona
1936 - Aldwych
1935 - Abbatoro
1934 - Brannon
1933 - Horometer
1932 - Tractable
1931 - Dark Mission
1930 - Irish Maiden
1929 - Sweet Sentiment
1928 - Butter John
1927 - Solace
1926 - Willie K.
1925 - Penstick
1924 - Caduceus
1923 - Turnberry
1922 - Prismar
1921 - Marble
1920 - Our Flag 
1919 - No race (World War I)
1918 - No race (World War I)
1917 - No race (World War I)
1916 - Arravan 
1915 - Candle
1914 - Lady Curzon 
1913 - Hodge 
1912 - Leochares  
1911 - Aldebaran
1910 - Picolata 
1909 - Penn 
1908 - Arondack  
1907 - Dredger 
1906 - Glimmer

See also
Road to the Kentucky Derby
 List of Canadian flat horse races

Horse races in Canada
Graded stakes races in Canada
Flat horse races for two-year-olds
Recurring sporting events established in 1906
Woodbine Racetrack
1906 establishments in Ontario